Ceroctis is a genus of beetles belonging to the family Meloidae.

The species of this genus are found in Europe and Africa.

Species:

Ceroctis angolensis 
Ceroctis aurantiaca 
Ceroctis capensis 
Ceroctis gyllenhalli 
Ceroctis interna 
Ceroctis korana 
Ceroctis subtrinotata

References

Meloidae